Tim Steele may refer to:
Tim Steele (footballer) (born 1967), former professional footballer
Tim Steele (racing driver) (born 1968), American race car driver in the ARCA Re/MAX Series

See also
Timothy Steele (born 1948), American poet